S101 may refer to:

Asus Eee PC S101, a netbook computer from Asus
Dome S101, a sports car prototype for endurance racing
Highway S101, proposed northern extension of New Jersey Route 101, never built
HMS Dreadnought (S101), the United Kingdom's first nuclear-powered submarine
New Jersey State Highway S101, a controlled-access toll road running north–south in eastern New Jersey
SAS Manthatisi (S101), a Heroine-class submarine in service with the South African Navy
Soviet submarine S-101, Stalinets-class submarine of the Soviet Navy